The 2002 United States House of Representatives elections in West Virginia were held on November 5, 2002 to determine who will represent the state of West Virginia in the United States House of Representatives. West Virginia has three seats in the House, apportioned according to the 2000 United States Census. Representatives are elected for two-year terms.

Overview

District 1 

 

Incumbent Democrat Alan Mollohan was re-elected unopposed. This district covers the northern part of the state.

District 2 

 

Incumbent Republican Shelley Moore Capito defeated Democrat Jim Humphreys. This district covers the central part of the state.

District 3 

 

Incumbent Democrat Nick Rahall defeated Republican Paul Chapman. This district covers the southern part of the state.

References 

2002 West Virginia elections
West Virginia
2002